Pizza Haven is a defunct Australian and New Zealand pizza restaurant chain and franchise operation.

History 
Founded in 1984, four brothers Evan, Louis, Bill and Gabriel Christou started Pizza Haven with the aid of a A$24,000 mortgage on their parents' home. The first Pizza Haven outlet was at Glenelg in Adelaide. Employing twelve people, the Christou brothers were active in the running of the business.

Pizza Haven evolved into a mid-sized franchised business model with approximately 180 outlets by the year 2000. A number of outlets were operated in Thailand during the mid to late 1990’s.
 
In January 2005, the New Zealand Pizza Haven stores were bought by Domino's Pizza. The majority were converted to Domino's while some stores were able to stay branded under Pizza Haven. Eventually all New Zealand Pizza Haven stores became Domino's.

In July 2008 it was announced that Pizza Haven Australia had been acquired by the Eagle Boys pizza chain (which was in turn acquired by Pizza Hut in 2016). All remaining Pizza Haven stores were eventually converted to Pizza Hut stores.

See also
 List of pizzerias in Australia
 List of fast-food restaurants

References

Further reading

External links

Pizza chains of Australia
Defunct restaurant chains
Defunct pizzerias
Pizza franchises
Fast-food franchises
Restaurants established in 1984
Restaurants disestablished in 2008
Australian companies established in 1984
Australian companies disestablished in 2008
Defunct restaurants in Australia